Colic vein may refer to:

 Left colic vein
 Middle colic vein
 Right colic vein